Mary Augusta Dickerson also known as Mary Dickerson Donahey (New York City, September 22, 1876 – March 31, 1962) was an American author of children's books and cookbooks.

Early life
Dickerson was born in New York City to Alfred James Dickerson and Nancy Augusta (Huggins) Dickerson. She graduated from the St. Mary's school in New York City as valedictorian. The school later merged with St. Garriel's School in Peekskill, New York.

Adult life
Dickerson began writing children's stories, articles and poem verses for newspapers and magazines in 1896. She was then associated with the New York Journal in 1898 as a reporter for a short time. Donahey later took on a full-time career as a special writer for The Plain Dealer that same year. Her career there extended into 1905.

Dickerson married William Donahey on August 16, 1905, becoming Mary Dickerson Donahey. She was also known as Mrs. William Donahey. They met while they both worked at the Plain Dealer. She introduced him to some traditional children's stories while they were working there, which helped to inspire him to become a comic strip writer and illustrator. He had missed out on these normal childhood stories because he was an introverted child and spent much of his childhood alone.

Clubs and societies
Dickerson was associated with or a member of the following:
 Illinois Woman's Press Association (president 1925–1927)
 Society of Midland Authors
 Cleveland Writers Club
 Writers Guild
 Episcopalian

 Club Matrix
 lecturer

Other
Dickerson, along with her husband William Donahey, owned the Pickle Barrel House in Grand Marais, Michigan. This was their summer home where they found it inspirational to write their children's books and comic strips. It is now a tourist attraction.

Works

Mary Augusta Dickerson, writing under her married name Mary Dickerson Donahey, wrote the following books:

 The Wonderful Wishes of Jacky and Jean (1905)
 The Castle of Grumpy Grouch a Fairy Story (1908)
 Mysterious Mansions (1909)
 Down Spider Web Lane: A Fairy Tale (1909)
 Through the Little Green Door (1910)
 The Adventures of a Happy Doll (1914)
 Peter And Prue (1914)
 The Magical House of Zur (1914)
 The Prince Without a Country (1916)
 Lady Teddy Comes to Town (1919)
 The Talking Bird and Wonderful Wishes of Jacky and Jean (1920)
 The Teenie Weenie Man's Mother Goose (1921)
 The Calorie Cook Book Menus for Reducing, for Upbuilding, for Maintenance (1923)
 The Calorie Cook Book (1923)
 Peter and Prue (1924)
 Best Tales for Children (1924)
 Cupboard Love: My Book of Recipes (1929)
 The Tavern of Folly (1930)
 The Cooking Pots of Grand Marais (1930; reprint edition 1976)
 The Spanish McQuades, the Lost Treasure of Zavala (1931)
 Mary Lu (1937)
 Apple Pie Inn (1942)
 The Castle of Grumpy Grouch (1948)
 Mystery in the Pines (1950)

Example of work
The Prince Without a Country, New York: Barse & Hopkins, 1916, page 71

The Adventures of a Happy Dolly, New York: Barse & Hopkins, 1914, page 11
{{cquote|But none of the other dolls was any wiser than I.  Not so wise, for the doll next me, a silly, black-haired thing in yellow, was frightened and cried and started a baby doll crying too. It was pretty dreadful for a while, and what I would have done to quiet the foolish things I can't guess, if I'd had to do it all alone.

But there were two funny, plucky little Jap dollies there too, and they laughed at the baby doll and the black-haired one, while I comforted them and so we got them quiet at last.

"There's no use getting frightened till you're sure you're going to be hurt. Then don't cry. Just think of a way out," I told them. And the boy Jap stood up in his funny little red dressing-gown sort of suit and made me a stiff bow."Those words are bravest I have heard from any doll in this so honorable country," he said. "Honorable Miss, you are wise as you are beautiful." Then he made me another bow, and the black-haired doll got so angry she forgot to be frightened and we had no more trouble with her. She didn't even join in when we talked together. And we did have such funny, interesting talks, that queer, dear little Japanese boy and I! }}

References
 Who was who in America with World Notables'', p. 256, Marquis — Who's Who, Volume IV (1961–1968), Library of Congress Card Number 43-3789.

Notes

External links

1876 births
1962 deaths
20th-century American novelists
American children's writers
American food writers
American comics writers
American fantasy writers
Writers from New York City
Writers from Cleveland
People from Alger County, Michigan
American women novelists
Women science fiction and fantasy writers
Novelists from New York (state)
Novelists from Ohio
American women non-fiction writers
Female comics writers
20th-century American women writers